International Finance Centre, or International Financial Centre, or IFC may refer to one of the following:

Finance hub 
 Finance centre
 Offshore financial centre

Buildings 
 International Finance Centre (Hong Kong)
 International Finance Center Seoul
 Busan International Finance Center
 Busan International Finance Center–Busan Bank Station
 Guangzhou International Finance Center
 JW Marriott International Finance Centre
 Ping An Finance Centre
 Rose Rock International Finance Center
 Shanghai IFC
 Shenyang International Finance Center
 Suzhou IFS

See also 

 Chongqing International Trade and Commerce Center
 International Commerce Centre